Gual may refer to:

People
 Adrià Gual (1872–1943), Spanish playwright
 Anna Gual (born 1996), Spanish water polo player
 Jordi Gual (born 1957), Spanish economist
 José Costas Gual (1918–2011), Spanish astronomer
 Marc Gual (born 1996), Spanish footballer
 Miguel Gual (1919–2010), Spanish racing cyclist
 Orlando Requeijo Gual (fl. 2004–2006), Cuban diplomat 
 Pedro Mairata Gual (born 1979), Spanish footballer
 Pedro Gual Escandón (1783–1862), Venezuelan politician

Other
 Gual (grape), a Spanish wine grape
 A regional name of the Asian fish species Wallago attu

See also
Pedro Gual Municipality, Venezuela

Catalan-language surnames